William Addis may refer to:

William Addis (colonial administrator) (1901–1978), British governor of Seychelles
William Addis (entrepreneur) (1734–1808), English inventor of the first mass-produced toothbrush 
William Edward Addis (1844–1917), Scottish-born Australian colonial clergyman
William Adyes or Addis (1520–1558/9), English politician, MP for Worcester